Giulio Aristide Sartorio (11 February 1860 – 3 October 1932) was an Italian painter and film director from Rome.

Biography
Having attended the Rome Institute of Fine Arts, Sartorio presented a Symbolist work at the 1883 International Exposition of Rome. He formed friendships with Nino Costa and Gabriele D’Annunzio, and associated with the painters and photographers of the Roman countryside. He won a gold medal at the Paris Universal Exhibition of 1889 and met the Pre-Raphaelites in England in 1893. His participation in the Venice Biennale began in 1895 with the 1st International Exposition of Art of Venice, after which he taught at the Weimar Academy of Fine Arts from 1896 to 1898.

His period of greatest renown came at the beginning of the century, when he produced decorative friezes for the 5th Esposizione Internazionale d’Arte of Venice (1903), the Mostra Nazionale of Fine Arts (Milan, Parco Sempione, 1906) and Palazzo Montecitorio in Rome (1908–12). Wounded during World War I, he travelled extensively in the Middle East, Japan and Latin America during the 1920s and became a member of the Italian Royal Academy.

Works
His most famous works are: Diana of Ephes and the slaves, Gorgon and the Heroes (1895–99) and a frieze in the Palazzo Montecitorio. He also collaborated with Gabriele D'Annunzio in a magazine entitled The Banquet (1895–98).

He directed the motion picture Il mistero di Galatea (1919), starring Marga Sevilla, his wife, who studied acting with Eleonora Duse.

Selected filmography
 The Sack of Rome (1920)

References
 Antonella Crippa, Giulio Aristide Sartorio, online catalogue Artgate by Fondazione Cariplo, 2010, CC BY-SA (source for the first revision of this article).

External links
 
 

1860 births
1932 deaths
Painters from Rome
19th-century Italian painters
Italian male painters
20th-century Italian painters
Members of the Royal Academy of Italy
Modern painters
Italian film directors
Italian military personnel of World War I
19th-century Italian male artists
20th-century Italian male artists
Symbolist painters